Egypt's Love Cup 1986, is an Egyptian football tournament.
This championship was organized by the Egyptian higher Council for youth and sports in coordination with the Egyptian Football Association. This championship was held once and Zamalek football club won the cup when Gamal Abdul Hamid scored the single goal in Ahmed Shobair's goal in the 82nd minute.

"The Black Deer", Ibrahim Youssef was the one who raised the cup as he was Zamalek's captain in 1986.

References

Defunct football competitions in Egypt